A tenement is a building with several storeys accommodating dwellings set above each other. In Scotland it is a well-regarded form of urban living including new tenements built recently, but in many other English-speaking areas, the term commonly refers to a substandard multi-family dwelling in the urban core, usually old and occupied by the poor.

Tenement may also refer to:

Tenement (law), a concept in property or mining law
Tenement (band), an American rock band
Tenement (film), a 1985 film
Tenement House (Glasgow), a museum in Glasgow